Crypsiphona amaura is a moth of the family Geometridae first described by Edward Meyrick in 1888. It is found in the Australian state of Western Australia.

References

Moths described in 1888
Pseudoterpnini